The Wairua River is a river of Northland, New Zealand. It flows south-west from Hikurangi and joins the Mangakahia River between Titoki and Tangiteroria to form the Wairoa River, which runs past Dargaville to the Kaipara Harbour.

See also
List of rivers of New Zealand

References

Rivers of the Northland Region
Rivers of New Zealand
Kaipara Harbour catchment